The 1981 Sonoma State Cossacks football team represented Sonoma State University as an independent during the 1981 NCAA Division II football season. Led by Milt Cerf in his second and final season as head coach, Sonoma State compiled a record of 3–7. The team was outscored by its opponents 245 to 117 for the season. The Cossacks played home games at Cossacks Stadium in Rohnert Park, California.

Schedule

Notes

References

Sonoma State
Sonoma State Cossacks football seasons
Sonoma State Cossacks football